The Magyar Kupa Final was the final match of the 2010–11 Magyar Kupa, played between Kecskemét and Videoton.

Route to the final

Match

References

External links
 Official site 

2011
Kecskeméti TE matches
Fehérvár FC matches
2011 in Hungary